The Delmont Pumphouse is a historic waterworks facility and fire station on West Main Street in Delmont, South Dakota.  It is a single story brick structure, built in 1903 by the city to house a compression tank for its water supply.  In 1907 it was enlarged to also house the city's fire truck.  It was used as a firehouse until 1968, and was used for storage thereafter.  It has been restored and is now a museum operated by the Historical Society of Delmont.

The building was listed on the National Register of Historic Places in 1998.

See also
National Register of Historic Places listings in Douglas County, South Dakota

References

Fire stations on the National Register of Historic Places in South Dakota
Museums in Douglas County, South Dakota
Fire stations completed in 1903
National Register of Historic Places in Douglas County, South Dakota
History museums in South Dakota
1903 establishments in South Dakota